Pellworm is an Amt ("collective municipality") in the district of Nordfriesland, in Schleswig-Holstein, Germany. Its seat is in Pellworm.

In 2008, the administrative community office was merged with the administration of the town of Husum, whereas the Amt remains a political entity of its own.

Subdivision
The Amt Pellworm consists of the following municipalities:

Gröde 
Hooge 
Langeneß 
Pellworm

References 

Ämter in Schleswig-Holstein